Chief Boot Knocka is the fourth album by rapper Sir Mix-a-Lot. The album was released in 1994 by American Recordings as the follow-up to his successful previous album, Mack Daddy. The album reached No. 69 on the Billboard 200 and No. 28 on the Top R&B/Hip-Hop Albums chart. The song "Just da Pimpin' in Me" was nominated for the Grammy Award for Best Rap Solo Performance.

Track listing 
All tracks by Sir Mix-a-Lot except where noted.

 "Sleepin' wit My Fonk" (Clinton, Collins) – 4:06 
 "Let It Beaounce" – 4:20 
 "Ride" – 3:37 
 "Take My Stash" – 4:36 
 "Brown Shuga" – 4:11 
 "What's Real" – 4:15 
 "Double da Pleasure" – :59 
 "Put 'em on the Glass" – 3:28 
 "Chief Boot Knocka" – 4:19 
 "Don't Call Me Da Da" – 4:30 
 "Nasty Dogs and Funky Kings" – 4:00 
 "Monsta Mack" – 4:05 
 "Just da Pimpin' in Me" – 3:17 
 "I Checks My Bank" – 4:09

Personnel 
 Eugenius – producer, arranger, programming
 Melvone Farrell – make-up
 Flea – bass
 Ricardo Frazer – executive producer
 Jeri Heiden – art direction
 Annalisa Pessin – photography
 Michael Powers – guitar
 Rick Rubin – executive producer
 Sir Mix-A-Lot – arranger, programming, producer, engineer, executive producer, mixing
 Lisa Jayne Storey – hair stylist
 Strange – producer
 Dirk Walter – art direction, design

References

Sir Mix-a-Lot albums
1994 albums
Albums produced by Rick Rubin
American Recordings (record label) albums